Eleutherodactylus darlingtoni is a species of frog in the family Eleutherodactylidae endemic to the Massif de la Selle, Haiti; it is expected to occur in the Dominican Republic. It is a rare species occurring in high-elevation pine forest. It is threatened by habitat loss; while the species occurs in the La Visite National Park, there is no active management for conservation, and the habitat loss continues in the park.

References

darlingtoni
Endemic fauna of Haiti
Amphibians of Haiti
Taxa named by Doris Mable Cochran
Amphibians described in 1935
Taxonomy articles created by Polbot